The list of debutante balls in the United States aims to include notable debutante balls held in the United States.

Alabama
Birmingham:
The Ball of Roses
Mobile
 The Camellia Ball, held the Wednesday before Thanksgiving.

California

Los Angeles:
Las Madrinas Ball
Peninsula Ball - 
Bal Blanc de Noel - presentation of Les Fleurettes

District of Columbia

Washington, D.C.:
The National Debutante Cotillion and Thanksgiving Ball

Florida 

 Tampa:
 Ye Mystic Krewe of Gasparilla Debutante Ball
 Sarasota:
 The Debutante Program of Sarasota & Manatee Counties
Fort Myers:  The Edison Pageant of Light Ball

Indiana
Indianapolis:
Presentation of Daughters, Held since 1950 during the holiday season, the Presentation is a biennial cotillion of The Dramatic Club of Indianapolis (founded 1889).

Kentucky

 Lexington:
 The Bluegrass Charity Ball

Louisiana

To be considered a Debutante in *New Orleans, a young woman must be presented at a party by her family and/or their friends, and at one or more of the following Clubs:
Le Debut des Jeunes Filles de la Nouvelle Orleans
The Bachelor's Club
The Pickwick Club
The Debutante Club
The Mid-Winter Cotillion
The Original Illinois Club
The Young Men Illinois Club

New Orleans Debutantes may also be invited to be presented in one or more Carnival organizations' balls, along with other young ladies who may not be making a formal debut, although the organizations generally prefer that the ladies they present are formally debuting):

Mistick Krewe of Comus, Founded in 1856(or 7)
The Twelfth Night Revelers (TNR), founded in 1870
Knights of Momus, founded in 1872
Rex, founded in 1872
Krewe of Proteus, founded in 1882
The Atlanteans, founded in 1891
Elves of Oberon, founded in 1895
Krewe of Nereus, founded in 1895
The High Priests of Mithras, founded in 1897
Krewe of Athenians, founded 1909
Krewe of Mystery, founded in 1912
Mystic, founded in 1923
Prophets of Persia, founded 1927
The Grand Ball of Osiris, founded in 1934
Dorians, founded in 1937
Caliphs of Cairo, founded 1937
Krewe of Achaeans, founded in 1947

And/or in other organizations' presentations, like:
Society of the War of 1812 in Louisiana

Maryland
Washington D.C.:
 Gridiron Club Dinner
 United States presidential inaugural balls
 Russian Ball, Washington, D.C.
 Assembly Club of Hagerstown, MD

Massachusetts

Boston:
The Boston Cotillion, which benefits the Vincent Memorial Hospital.

Michigan
Detroit:
The Debutante Club

Missouri

Kansas City:
The Jewel Ball, founded in 1954, which benefits the Nelson-Atkins Museum of Art and the Kansas City Symphony.
St. Louis:
The Veiled Prophet Ball, founded in 1878, which caters to the members of the Veiled Prophet Organization, a secret society of prominent St. Louisans 
Fleur de Lis Ball, a Roman Catholic ball founded in 1959, named after the symbol associated with French kings and the city's French heritage, which raises money for the Cardinal Glennon Children's Hospital.
Springfield:
The Heather Court Ball, associated with Highland Springs Country Club. All presentees are the daughters or granddaughters of Members and are of at least 16 years of age.
The Snowflake Ball, associated with Hickory Hill Country Club. All presentees are the daughters and granddaughters of Members.

Nebraska 

 Omaha:
 Omaha Symphony Debutante Ball was established in 1966 as an annual fund-raising event traditionally held on December 27.

New York

New York City:
 Alfred E. Smith Memorial Foundation Dinner
The International Debutante Ball, held each even-numbered year
The Viennese Opera Ball in New York

Rochester:
The Rochester Bachelors' Cotillion was founded in 1950 by a group of single young men from some of Rochester's social circles that wished to repay their social debt. It is a white tie ball held annually at the Genesee Valley Club.

North Carolina
Cary:
The Cary Debutante Society Ball
Durham:
Debutante Cotillion and Christmas Ball of Durham
Gastonia:
Gastonia Debutante Ball
Greensboro:
The Greensboro Symphony Presentation Ball
Greenville:
Carolinian Debutante Ball
Raleigh:
The Terpsichorean Society Debutante Ball
Wilmington:
 North Carolina Azalea Festival

Ohio
Cleveland:
The Assembly Ball, presented by The Recreation League of Cleveland annually since 1937 at The Union Club.
CINCINNATI - The Bachelors Cotillion, held annually since 1925

Pennsylvania
Pittsburgh:
Cinderella Ball, founded in 1924.
Philadelphia:
The Philadelphia Charity Ball, founded in 1881.

South Carolina

Charleston:
The St. Cecilia Ball
Lexington
The Lexington Cotillion Holiday Ball
Greenville: The Assembly

Texas
Laredo:
The Society of Martha Washington Debutante Ball
Tyler:
The Texas Rose Festival
Dallas:
The Idlewild Club 
San Antonio:
The Chairty Ball
Fort Worth:
Steeplechase Ball
Waxahachie:
Symphony Belles and Beaus

Virginia 
Chantilly:
The Old Dominion Cotillion
Ettrick:
Wives of Beaux-Twenty Debutante Cotillion
Richmond:
Bal du Bois
The Richmond German Christmas Dance

Washington
Tacoma:
Tacoma Holiday Cotillion

References

Dance in the United States
Adolescence in the United States